Ivan Della Mea (born Luigi Della Mea, 16 October 1940 – 14 June 2009) was an Italian novelist, journalist, singer-songwriter and political activist. His family name was "Della Mea"

Biography
Born in Lucca, his family moved to Milan when he was a child. He worked in a factory, but eventually started to work at a small newspaper, Stasera.
 
In 1956 he joined the Italian Communist Party (PCI). He started his career as a singer and songwriter in Milanese dialect the same year. 

In the 1960s, he belonged to the Italian Nuova canzone politica and became active in the magazine Nuovo Canzoniere Italiano. As a writer he started publishing some works in the 1980s/1990s, including three novels, and as a journalist. With his brother, Luciano, he wrote for Il Grandevetro, and worked at l'Unità and Liberazione.

His brother was political activist Luciano Della Mea (1924–2003).

Discography

Albums

Io so che un giorno (1966, LP)
Il rosso è diventato giallo (1979, LP)
La balorda (1972, LP)
Se qualcuno ti fa morto (1972, LP)
Ringhera (1974, LP)
Fiaba grande (1975, LP)
La piccola ragione di allegria (1978, LP)
Sudadio giudabestia (1979, LP)
Sudadio giudabestia 2 (1980, LP)
Karlett (1983, LP)
Ho male all'orologio (1997, CD)
La cantagranda forse walzer (2000, CD)

EP and 45 rpm

Ballate della violenza (1962, EP)
Ho letto sul giornale (1964, EP)
La mia vita ormai (1965, EP)
O cara moglie/Io ti chiedo di fare all'amore (1966, 45 rpm)
Ciò che voi non-dite/La linea rossa (1967, 45 rpm, with G.Marini)
La nave dei folli (EP, 1972)

Literature
Works of Ivan Della Mea:
Il sasso dentro (1990; Interno Giallo editions)
Se nasco un'altra volta ci rinuncio (1992; Interno Giallo editions)
Sveglia sul buio (1997; Est editions)

External links

 A tribute from the Resistance Archives
 Infos on ildeposito.org

1940 births
2009 deaths
Italian communists
Italian  male singer-songwriters
Italian folk singers
Italian male writers
Writers from Lucca
Musicians from Lucca
Singers from Milan
20th-century Italian  male singers
Politicians from Lucca